Barice may refer to:

Bosnia and Herzegovina
 Barice, Donji Vakuf
 Barice, Stari Grad

Montenegro
 Barice, Montenegro

Serbia
 Barice, Plandište